The Capture of HMS St Fermin was a naval engagement that took place off Málaga on 4 April 1781, during the American Revolutionary War. Spanish xebecs San Antonio and San Luis captured the sloop-of-war .

Events

Background
At the end of December 1779, a large fleet sailed from Great Britain under the command of Admiral Sir George Brydges Rodney, being one of the purposes of this British fleet to resupply Gibraltar, a place that was blocked by land and sea by the Spaniards. During the trip, Rodney intercepted a Spanish convoy of the Royal Guipuzcoan Company of Caracas at Cape Finisterre on 8 January 1780, capturing it completely.

Among the ships captured by Rodney, was the 16-gun armed merchant San Fermín, being one of the captured ships that the admiral took to Gibraltar. The British commissioned San Fermín in that place as the 16-gun sloop of war HMS St Fermin, under Commander Jonathan Faulknor. Since then, he participated in some actions of the siege of Gibraltar.

Capture
On the evening of 3 April 1781 HMS St Fermin departed from Gibraltar to Menorca with dispatches. At that time, the British maintained contact with the British forces there, at least until 1782 when the Spaniards conquered the island, sending fast sailships to avoid the Spanish blockade.

St Fermin managed to pass the waters of the Strait of Gibraltar without problems, but the Spaniards had several naval stations in the area from where they could detect and intercept British ships. From the naval station of Punta del Carnero, an enclave south of Algeciras, two square-rigged xebecs of the Spanish Navy sailed to chase the British ship. The xebecs were the 26-gun San Antonio under Captain José Herrera-Dávila and the 24-gun San Luis under Lieutenant Federico Gravina, manned by more than two hundred men. That night, Faulknor saw the two Spanish ships approaching and did everything possible to escape. At eleven o'clock at night the Spaniards lost sight of him, but half an hour later they spotted him again. At four o'clock in the morning, the Spaniards were within striking distance of HMS St Fermin, beginning the attack with their chase guns, responding to the British ship with their stern guns. Herrera-Davila's ship approached the British ship's port flap and fired several shots, which was enough for Faulknor to surrender. The two Spanish ships could have made a boarding attack if the fight had continued.

Aftermath
The British ship had a crew of 138 men, taken prisoners, once they were marinated by a Spanish contingent in charge of Lieutenant Miguel Pedrueca. The Spanish took the captured ship to Cartagena. He was then assigned to the naval service in the Spanish Navy as the 16-gun San Fermín, being excluded from the service in 1785.

Notes

References

Bibliography
 
 

Conflicts in 1781
1781 in Spain
Naval battles involving Spain
Naval battles involving Great Britain
Naval battles of the Anglo-Spanish War (1779–1783)
Naval battles of the American Revolutionary War
Naval battles of the American Revolutionary War involving Spain